Romblomanon or Bisaya/Binisaya nga Romblomanon is an Austronesian regional language spoken, along with Asi and Onhan, in the province of Romblon in the Philippines. The language is also called Ini, Tiyad Ini, Basi, Niromblon, and Sibuyanon. It is a part of the Bisayan language family and is closely related to other Philippine languages.

Geographic distribution
Specifically, Romblomanon is spoken in the following islands on Romblon:

Romblon: the sole municipality of Romblon.
Sibuyan: all its municipalities, Cajidiocan, Magdiwang, and San Fernando.
Tablas: the municipality of San Agustin.
Oriental Mindoro: migrant Romblomanon speakers from Carmen in Tablas brought the language particularly to the municipality of Bansud and also migrant Romblomanon speakers from Tablas, Romblon and Sibuyan islands to the following municipalities of Mansalay, Bulalacao and parts of Bongabong and Roxas respectively.

Phonology

Consonants 

Romblomanon is one of the Philippine languages that do not exhibit – allophony.

Vowels 

Grammar

Pronouns

Personal

Demonstrative pronouns

Interrogative words

Examples

Loan words

Numbers

Common expressions

References

Further reading

External links 
 Ethnologue
 romblomanon.webonary.org - Dictionary by SIL

Languages of Romblon
Visayan languages